Diamonds Unlocked is the twelfth album by German guitarist Axel Rudi Pell. It is a cover album released in September/October 2007. The album consists of 10 cover tracks and 1 self-written introduction track. Axel Rudi Pell attempted to make cover versions of tracks from typically "non-metal" artists including Phil Collins and Michael Bolton in order to show how these songs would be done in his signature melodic rock/metal style.

Track listing
 "The Diamond Overture" (Axel Rudi Pell) - 1:41
 "Warrior" (Riot) - 3:42
 "Beautiful Day" (U2) - 4:46
 "Stone" (Chris Rea) - 6:36
 "Love Gun" (Kiss) - 4:04
 "Fools Game" (Michael Bolton) - 3:58
 "Heartbreaker" (Free) - 6:55
 "Rock the Nation" (Montrose) - 4:05
 "In the Air Tonight" (Phil Collins) - 8:38
 "Like a Child Again" (The Mission) - 4:48
 "Won't Get Fooled Again" (The Who) - 6:12

Charts:
 Germany No. 60
 Switzerland No. 81

Personnel
 Axel Rudi Pell - guitars
 Johnny Gioeli - vocals
 Ferdy Doernberg - keyboards, acoustic guitar on "Love Gun"
 Volker Krawczak - bass guitar, acoustic guitar on "Love Gun"
 Mike Terrana - drums, percussion

References

External links
[ Diamonds Unlocked at AllMusic.com]
Diamonds Unlocked at Amazon.com

Axel Rudi Pell albums
Covers albums
2007 albums
SPV/Steamhammer albums